North West Hampshire is a constituency represented in the House of Commons of the UK Parliament since 2015 by Conservative Kit Malthouse, who served as Education Secretary in 2022.

History 

This constituency's results suggest a Conservative safe seat since its creation for the 1983 general election.  The outgoing MP for Basingstoke, David Mitchell, was elected the first MP as he chose to represent the area carved out from the old seat, where he lived instead, and served for fourteen years.  On Sir David Mitchell's retirement in 1997 George Young won the seat and held it until his resignation in 2015. Young was previously MP for the marginal constituency of Ealing, Acton from 1974 to 1997, and was Transport Secretary in the Government of John Major from 1995 to 1997. He also ran for Speaker of the House in 2000 and 2009, being defeated on both occasions. Young was appointed Leader of the House of Commons in the coalition government following the 2010 general election, but returned to the backbenches in David Cameron's cabinet reshuffle of 4 September 2012 and returned to the government frontbenches as Chief Whip a few weeks later, in October 2012 in place of Mitchell's son Andrew Mitchell. In 2015, Young was succeeded by Kit Malthouse, also a Conservative.

The 2010 result placed the seat 31st of the 307 Conservative seats by share of the vote polled.

Constituency profile
The constituency is in the county of Hampshire focused around the town of Andover which has small pockets of regionally high levels of social housing and unemployment; however, the seat overall had the 32nd lowest level of claimants of the 84 seats in the South East, at 1.7%, lower than the regional average of 2.4%.

The economy is built on the military research, building and operations in the area and larger homes attracting wealthy older families and retirees, a high proportion of which are detached or semi-detached in both authorities covered, building and engineering industries and the ease of most areas to access London, Basingstoke, Reading and the Commuter Belt. Smaller towns in the constituency include Tadley and Whitchurch.

Boundaries 

1983–1997: The Borough of Test Valley wards of Alamein, Anna, Bourne Valley, Dun Valley, Harewood, Harrow Way, Kings Somborne and Michelmersh, Millway, Nether Wallop and Broughton, Over Wallop, St Mary's, Stockbridge, Tedworth, Weyhill, and Winton, and the Borough of Basingstoke and Deane wards of Baughurst, Burghclere, East Woodhay, Kingsclere, Overton, St Mary Bourne, Tadley Central, Tadley North, Tadley South, and Whitchurch.

1997–2010: The Borough of Test Valley wards of Alamein, Anna, Bourne Valley, Harrow Way, Millway, St Mary's, Tedworth, Weyhill, and Winton, and the Borough of Basingstoke and Deane wards of Baughurst and Heath End, Burghclere, East Woodhay, Highclere and Bourne, Kingsclere, Oakley and North Waltham, Overton and Laverstoke, Sherborne St John, Tadley, and Whitchurch.

2010–present: The Borough of Test Valley wards of Alamein, Amport, Anna, Bourne Valley, Charlton, Harrow Way, Millway, Penton Bellinger, St Mary's, and Winton, and the Borough of Basingstoke and Deane wards of Baughurst, Burghclere, East Woodhay, Highclere and Bourne, Kingsclere, Oakley and North Waltham, Overton, Laverstoke and Steventon, Tadley North, Tadley South, and Whitchurch.

Members of Parliament

Elections

Elections in the 2010s

UKIP originally selected Diane James for this constituency. In March 2015 James was replaced firstly by Malcolm Bint, then shortly afterwards by Susan Perkins. Bint became candidate in North Durham.

Elections in the 2000s

Elections in the 1990s

Elections in the 1980s

See also 
 List of parliamentary constituencies in Hampshire

Notes

References

Parliamentary constituencies in Hampshire
Constituencies of the Parliament of the United Kingdom established in 1983